The Poneasca is a left tributary of the river Miniș in Romania. It discharges into the Miniș near the village Poneasca.

References

Rivers of Romania
Rivers of Caraș-Severin County